Mission Escape! is a 1980 video game published by CE Software for the Apple II, programmed by Jim Jacobson.

Contents
Mission Escape! is a science-fiction game in which the hero is trying to fight his way through a series of rooms, each one infested with troopers, drones, and missile-firing robots.

Reception
Steve Jackson reviewed Mission Escape! in The Space Gamer No. 44. Jackson commented that "on the whole, it's a great way to kill an evening.  Recommended for Apple owners who like reflex-testing games."

Graham Masters Jr. reviewed the game for Computer Gaming World, and stated that "Mission Escape is one of a handful of games to combine arcade features with what is in reality a strategy game."

References

External links
Softalk review
Review in Electronic Games
Review in Creative Computing

1980 video games
Apple II games
Apple II-only games
Video games developed in the United States